Pirin is a protein that in humans is encoded by the PIR gene.

This gene encodes a member of the cupin superfamily. The encoded protein is an Fe(II)-containing nuclear protein expressed in all tissues of the body and concentrated within dot-like subnuclear structures. Interactions with nuclear factor I/CCAAT box transcription factor as well as B cell lymphoma 3-encoded oncoprotein suggest the encoded protein may act as a transcriptional cofactor and be involved in the regulation of DNA transcription and replication. Alternatively spliced transcript variants have been described.

Interactions
PIR (gene) has been shown to interact with BCL3.

References

Further reading